Ishkoshim, also Ishkashim, is a village and a jamoat in south-east Tajikistan. It is the seat of Ishkoshim District in Gorno-Badakhshan Autonomous Region. The jamoat has a total population of 7,673 (2015). It lies on the river Panj, at the point where its direction turns sharply north. Ishkoshim lies opposite a town of the same name in Afghanistan, although the name of the Afghan town is normally transliterated Ishkashim. A bridge opened in 2006 links the two towns.
There are plans to reconstruct the 100-km highway connecting Ishkoshim to the regional capital Khorugh, which has been damaged by snow avalanches.

References

Populated places in Gorno-Badakhshan
Afghanistan–Tajikistan border crossings